This is Buenos Aires (Así es Buenos Aires) is a 1971  Argentine musical film comedy directed by Emilio Vieyra and written by Salvador Valverde Calvo. The film starred Hugo Marcel and Víctor Bó. The tango film was premièred in Argentina on May 6, 1971.

Cast
Hugo Marcel
Soledad Silveyra
Ricardo Bauleo
Víctor Bó
Nelly Panizza
Walter Kliche
Adriana Hope
Lucio Deval
Gloria Prat
Esther Velázquez
Susana Giménez
Silvio Soldán as Narrator (voice)
Alfredo Suárez
Juan Manuel Tenuta

External links

1971 films
Argentine musical comedy films
1970s Spanish-language films
Tango films
Argentine black-and-white films
1970s musical comedy films
Films shot in Buenos Aires
Films set in Buenos Aires
1971 comedy films
1970s Argentine films
Films directed by Emilio Vieyra